Fertőrákos is a village in the county of Győr-Moson-Sopron in Hungary. In 2001 it had a population of 2,182.

In summer, a border checkpoint for pedestrians and cyclists connects it to the Austrian municipality of Mörbisch am See. The Fertorakos mithraeum is visible near the border. Fertőrákos also features a small port with a border checkpoint, and a sand beach swimming area, access to which prior to 1989 was restricted to the communist elite.

The village was first mentioned in 1199 under the name Racus. In 1457 it was first mentioned in German language as Krewspach, later Kroisbach. Today, it forms part of the Austrian-Hungarian national park and joint World Heritage Site of Lake Fertő.

The Wagner - Liszt Fesztivál is an annual event held at the Fertőrákos cave theater and in Sopron.

Following the occupation of Hungary in 1944, the new extremist pro-nazi regime established a 'transit/labour camp' in a quarry in Fertőrákos, to which Hungarian Jewish and political prisoners were sent, and many thousands died here, with others transported onward to Nazi concentration camps in German-occupied Poland and Germany. The site of the transit camp can be visited, and has a memorial plaque.

Controversy
There have been petitions to rename the village due to the name literally meaning "(you should) get infected by cancer".

External links

Official website 

Populated places in Győr-Moson-Sopron County